Rosa Pisano (15 October 1919 – 24 December 1975) was an Italian stage, film and television actress.

Life and career 
Pisano was born in Naples, into a family of dialect theatre actors. She debuted on stage as a child actress in her family company, and later entered the stage company of Eduardo and Peppino De Filippo. After the war and after the dissolution of the company she continued working with Eduardo De Filippo, and starting from the 1950s with other companies, notably the one held by Nino Taranto. Pisano was also active in films and on television, even if mainly cast in supporting roles.

Partial filmography 

 Non ti pago! (1942) - Una giocatrice al lotto
 Assunta Spina (1948) - Una lavorante all stireria (uncredited)
 Side Street Story (1950) - Assunta
 Filumena Marturano (1951) - Lucia
 Anna (1951) - Suor Carmela
 Toto in Color (1952) 
 Deceit (1952) - La signora litigiosa
 Non è vero... ma ci credo (1952) - Concetta
 The Country of the Campanelli (1954) - Annie
 Tarantella napoletana (1954) - Troupe Member
 The Doctor of the Mad (1954)
 Prima di sera (1954) - Francesca - Bancanis' servant
 Toto and Carolina (1955) - Sig.ra Barozzoli (uncredited)
 Are We Men or Corporals? (1955)
 The Two Friends (1955) - Moglie di Vincenzo
 Folgore Division (1955) - Post Office Worker
 I giorni più belli (1956) - Angelina - La bidella
 Ci sposeremo a Capri (1956) - Rosetta
 Arrivano i dollari! (1957) - Rosina (uncredited)
 Il marito (1957) - Sofia
 I prepotenti (1958) - Zia Rosa
 La sfida (1958) - (uncredited)
 Tuppe tuppe, Marescià! (1958) - A Village Woman (uncredited)
 Ricordati di Napoli (1958) - Concettina
 La nipote Sabella (1959)
 Il vedovo (1959) - Nardi's employee
 Avventura in città (1959)
 The Traffic Policeman (1960) - Lisa (uncredited)
 Black City (1961) - Donna Amalia
 Pesci d'oro e bikini d'argento (1961)
 Always on Sunday (1962) - Anita
 L'amore difficile (1962)
 Le motorizzate (1963) - (uncredited)
 In ginocchio da te (1964) - Zia di Gianni is not Rosita Pisano
 I nostri mariti (1966) - Rosetta (segment "Il marito di Roberta")
 Mi vedrai tornare (1966)
 Io non protesto, io amo (1967) - Anna Maria
 I due vigili (1967) - Cesira
 I 2 pompieri (1968) - Caramella's Mother
 Pensando a te (1969)
 Lisa dagli occhi blu (1970) - School caretaker
 La Sciantosa (1970) - Lady President at the Duel
 Nel giorno del signore (1970)
 La ragazza del prete (1970)
 Venga a fare il soldato da noi (1971) - Palmira
 Boccaccio (1972) - Mannocchia
 When Women Were Called Virgins (1972) - Berta
 La mano nera (1973)
 Little Funny Guy (1973)
 Piedino il questurino (1974) - Nunziatina
 Libera, My Love (1975) - Matteo's Sister (final film role)

References

External links 
 

 

Actresses from Naples
Italian stage actresses
Italian film actresses
Italian television actresses
1919 births 
1975 deaths 
20th-century Italian actresses